The 2014–15 Central Michigan Chippewas men's basketball team represented Central Michigan University during the 2014–15 NCAA Division I men's basketball season. The Chippewas, led by third year head coach Keno Davis, played their home games at McGuirk Arena, as members of the West Division of the Mid-American Conference. They finished the season 23–9, 12–6 in MAC play to be champions of the West Division and share the overall MAC regular season championship with Buffalo. They advanced to the championship game of the MAC tournament where they lost to Buffalo. As a conference champion, and #1 seed in their conference tournament, who failed to win their conference tournament they received an automatic bid to the National Invitation Tournament where they lost in the first round to Louisiana Tech.

Previous season
The Chippewas finished the season 10–21, 3–15 in MAC play to finish in fifth place in the West Division. They lost in the first round of the MAC tournament to Eastern Michigan.

Off season

Departures

Recruiting class of 2014

Recruiting class of 2015

Roster

Schedule and results
Source: 

|-
!colspan=9 style="background:#660033; color:#FFCC00;"| Exhibition

|-
!colspan=9 style="background:#660033; color:#FFCC00;"| Non-conference games

|-
!colspan=9 style="background:#660033; color:#FFCC00;"| Conference games

|-
!colspan=9 style="background:#660033; color:#FFCC00;"| MAC tournament

|-
!colspan=9 style="background:#660033; color:#FFCC00;"| NIT

References

Central Michigan
Central Michigan Chippewas men's basketball seasons
Central Michigan